Viktor Viktorovich Tretiakov (born 17 October 1946) is a Russian violinist and conductor. Other spellings of his name are Victor, Tretyakov and Tretjakov.

Biography
The son of a musician who played in the military band in Siberian city of Krasnoyarsk, he showed an extraordinary musical talent very early, and started to play violin at the age of seven. He came to Moscow in 1954 and first studied in the junior division of the Moscow Conservatory Music College, and in 1956 entered Yuri Yankelevich's class at the Moscow Central Music School, later studying with him in the Moscow Conservatoire.

In 1966, at age 19, he won first prize in the Third International Tchaikovsky Competition and was invited to appear on several international concert tours—something that had become much easier after the pioneering visits outside the Soviet Union by artists such as Sviatoslav Richter, Emil Gilels, Mstislav Rostropovich and David Oistrakh. The influence of the last could be noticed in Tretyakov's interpretations and also in his choice of the repertoire; Tretyakov favored the great romantic violin concertos such as those by Brahms, Mendelssohn, Tchaikovsky, Sibelius and music of Prokofiev and Shostakovich. His unique style is supported by impeccable technique and profound musical insight with expressively articulate phrasing.

Named a People's Artist of the USSR in 1987, Tretyakov was granted the Russian Prize for the encouragement of achievements in art and literature known as "Triumph". He is laureate of the Shostakovich Prize, awarded by the Yuri Bashmet International Charitable Foundation, and the Glinka State Prize of the RSFSR (1981) (other recipients include the Borodin Quartet and composer Valery Gavrilin). In 2001, he was awarded the Order of Service to the Fatherland by President Vladimir Putin.

Performing
Since winning the International Tchaikovsky Competition in 1966, Tretyakov has performed with almost every major orchestra in the world, including the Berlin, Vienna, Moscow, St. Petersburg, London, Los Angeles and Munich Philharmonic Orchestras, the London Symphony Orchestra, the Philharmonia Orchestra of London, the Royal Philharmonic, the Orchestre de Paris, the Dresden Staatskapelle, the Bamberg SO, the NDR Hamburg, the WDR Cologne, the NHK Symphony, the Kirov Orchestra, the Amsterdam Concertgebouw Orchestra, the Bavarian Radio Symphony Orchestra, the Vienna Symphony, the symphony orchestras of Chicago, Philadelphia, Cleveland, Atlanta, Detroit, San Francisco, Dallas, Pittsburgh, Toronto, and many others.
He has worked with conductors including Rostropovich, Ormandy, Temirkanov, Alekseev, Jochum, Krips, Gergiev, Fedoseyev, Maazel, Kempe, Jansons, Järvi, Levine, Mehta, von Dohnanyi, Penderecki, Previn, and Kondrashin. He plays a 1772 Nicolo Gagliano violin.

Teaching
For many years, Tretyakov has taught at the Moscow State Conservatory. In 1996, he also began to teach in Cologne, Germany. From 1986 to 1994, he was the jury president of the International Tchaikovsky Competition. Additionally, he has served as a jury member of competitions in Brussels, Hanover, Sendai, Moscow, Helsinki, Zagreb and many others. Notable students of his include Roman Kim, Ilya Kaler, Natalia Likhopoi, Dmitri Berlinsky, Evgeny Bushkov, Sergei Stadler and Daniel Austrich.

Chamber music
An active chamber musician, Tretyakov has performed together with Mstislav Rostropovich, Svyatoslav Richter, the Borodin Quartet, Oleg Kagan, David Geringas, Evgeny Kissin and Elisabeth Leonskaja. Together with Vassily Lobanov, Yuri Bashmet and Natalia Gutman, he has formed a piano quartet which performs regularly, including in concerts in Moscow, Berlin, Munich, Istanbul, Paris, Athens, Lisbon and Copenhagen.

References

People's Artists of the USSR
Russian classical violinists
Male classical violinists
1946 births
Living people
21st-century classical violinists
21st-century Russian male musicians